Riga Porcelain Museum is a ceramics museum in Riga, Latvia.

The museum opened on October 30, 2001. The museum regularly temporarily displays contemporary solo work by Latvian porcelain artists such as Aris Seglins, Peteris Martinsons, Zanete Zvigure, Inese Līne, and others.

References

External links
Official website 

Art museums established in 2001
Museums in Riga
Art museums and galleries in Latvia
Contemporary crafts museums
Ceramics museums
2001 establishments in Latvia
Porcelain